Captain Holly Short is a character in the Artemis Fowl novel series by Eoin Colfer.

Character outline
Holly Short is an unusual and spunky elf with an auburn crew cut (although she later grows a fringe) and 1 hazel and 1 blue eye, as well as the pointy ears typical of her species and nut-brown skin of a coffee complexion. She got her name because she is extremely short as she stands at one metre in height (said to be three feet in US editions), one centimetre shorter than the fairy average (an inch shorter in US editions), and has a gymnast-like stance. Like all elves, she is child-sized by human standards, but her bodily proportions are adult. According to Artemis Fowl and the Arctic Incident, Holly is about eighty years old (Elves and other magic species live much longer than humans. It is said that there is a dwarf over 2,000 years old in the book). Holly is the first and only female captain in the organisation LEPrecon. In The Artemis Fowl Files, she notes that she eventually earns the respect of her male colleagues. Holly will defy the orders of superiors and disobey rules if she believes that she can be of more help that way, and has got into trouble multiple times for defying a direct command. She is described as pretty, but in a dangerous way, comparable to a black widow. Her interests include playing the fairy game "Crunchball", reading (especially thrillers), and flying with artificial wings.

Holly lost her father at a young age. Her mother, Coral Short, is described as a European elf who was temperamental and had an appearance similar to Holly's. Artemis Fowl and the Time Paradox reveals that her mother worked in Lower Elements Police division "LEPmarine" and died after she was exposed to radiation, which is poisonous to fairies.

After Artemis Fowl and the Opal Deception, Holly quits the LEP because the new LEP commander, Ark Sool mentions that he will keep a close eye on her to catch any faults and she begins to work with Mulch Diggums.

However, after working as a private detective with Mulch for a short time, she returns to the Section 8 unit of the LEP in Artemis Fowl and the Lost Colony, in time to get Artemis, Butler and the others out of trouble.

Her relationship with Artemis Fowl has changed dramatically since the beginning of the series, morphing from hostility to grudging respect to friendship, and has recently included substantial hints of a romantic attraction despite the species and age gap (the mental and chronological age gaps being closed in Artemis Fowl and the Lost Colony and physical age gap briefly being closed for Artemis Fowl and The Time Paradox, both via extensive time travel).

Appearances

In Artemis Fowl
In Artemis Fowl, Holly is abducted by 12-year-old criminal mastermind Artemis Fowl II when he uncovers evidence of fairy existence. He demands one metric ton of gold as her ransom fund. When she consents to granting Artemis's wish of restoring his mother's sanity, he releases her along with half of her ransom fund. Holly also then realizes that she is up for a challenge, and promises to be waiting for him, with "a big gun and a smile."

In  The Arctic Incident
In Artemis Fowl and the Arctic Incident, Holly is sent to detain Artemis when he is a suspect in a goblin uprising. But to her surprise, the mud boy is innocent of this particular crime and has never traded with goblins. So she, along with Artemis, Mulch Diggums, and Commander Julius Root are informed by Foaly that Opal Koboi and Briar Cudgeon are behind the uprising. They break into Koboi Laboratories, where Briar Cudgeon is killed and Opal Koboi is incapacitated. After the goblins are contained, she travels to Murmansk to rescue Artemis's father, as they previously agreed in return for Artemis's help in capturing Briar Cudgeon and Opal Koboi.

In The Eternity Code
In Artemis Fowl and the Eternity Code, Artemis requests Holly's help to heal Domovoi Butler after he nearly died and retrieve his C Cube from American businessman Jon Spiro. Together with Mulch Diggums, Juliet Butler, and Foaly directing technological elements of the mission, they break into the Spiro Needle and retrieve the Cube. Artemis is mind wiped at the end of the mission under the directions of Julius Root.

In The Opal Deception
In Artemis Fowl and the Opal Deception, Holly is with Commander Root, a paternal figure to her, when Opal Koboi kills him. She is subsequently framed for the Commander's death and is forced to flee from fairy authorities. She later collaborates with Artemis Fowl, Butler, and Mulch Diggums to expose Koboi and prevent her plans for destroying fairy civilization. Koboi is locked up in a secure facility. At the end of the book, Holly resigns from the LEP.

In The Lost Colony
In Artemis Fowl and the Lost Colony, Holly is working as a private detective since her resignation from the LEP, along with Mulch Diggums. Though it was not going well and now they are bounty hunters, which are considered even less trustworthy then the criminals they track. Holly is informed about the demon race, a species of fairy that left earth and are now inhabiting an island in Limbo between earth and time, and is recruited to Section Eight, which monitors them. When it becomes apparent that Artemis has encountered a demon, they encounter Minerva Paradizo, another child genius who has managed to obtain a demon, and the deranged Billy Kong. Artemis and Holly, along with two demons, №1 and Qwan, are forced to go to Hybras to save demon civilization. When they arrive back at Artemis and Holly's time, they find that three years have passed in their own dimension.

In The Time Paradox
In Artemis Fowl and the Time Paradox, Artemis and Holly travel into the past to find the silky sifaka lemur, the only thing that can save Angeline Fowl from death by a fairy disease, Spelltropy. The pair are forced to outwit Artemis's younger self and Damon Kronski, president of the "Extinctionists" organization. They eventually encounter Opal Koboi, who needs the silky sifaka lemur to increase her own power. In the novel, Holly kisses Artemis, likes it, and quickly attributes it to the effects of time travel as she is now an adolescent fairy.

In The Atlantis Complex
In Artemis Fowl and the Atlantis Complex, Artemis is mentally ill; his dabbles with magic have resulted in his developing Atlantis Complex; a fairy disease equivalent to OCD and multiple-personality disorder. Atlantis Complex also gives the victim a large amount of paranoia. He arranges for Holly and her fairy companions to meet him at a glacier in Iceland. Later, however, when Artemis proceeds to demonstrate his invention- a means of curing global warming- outdoors, a hacked martian probe gone rogue descends and attacks the LEP ship on the glacier, killing several marines and Commander Raine Vinyaya, then heads towards Atlantis, the underwater fairy metropolis. Entangled in a conspiracy planned by Holly's old nemesis, the impending crisis and Artemis's rapid deterioration into a soppy alter-ego called Orion who perceives Holly as his 'fair princess' forces Holly to take the lead and find a way to bring back Artemis before it is too late.

In The Last Guardian
In Artemis Fowl and the Last Guardian, Artemis' condition has improved, with he and Holly having formed a certain friendship with 'Nopal', the near-brain-dead clone of Opal Koboi. When Opal's plan for revenge results in her releasing ancient fairy guardians, Artemis is forced to apparently sacrifice himself and Nopal to stop her, but provides Holly with a sample of his DNA that she can use to clone a new body for his discorporated soul. As the series concludes, Holly is sharing the book's content with Artemis`s revived but amnesic self.

In The Fowl Twins
In The Fowl Twins- a spin-off sequel series focusing on Artemis's younger brothers Myles and Beckett- Holly is revealed to have been promoted to Commodore, and also served as the (initially unknowing, alongside Artemis himself) template for NANNI, an artificial intelligence designed by Artemis to be the twins' guardian in the absence of the senior Fowls. She is also the mentor of Lieutenant Lazuli Heitz, a pixie-elf hybrid LEP officer who becomes associated with the Fowl twins during the crisis. At the conclusion of the novel, Lazuli is promoted to the position of head of the Fowl-fairy liaison office to maintain contact with the twins, after it is determined that the magic they retained following their possession by guardian spirits in Last Guardian legally qualifies them as magical creatures under fairy law.

In film
In 2001, plans were announced for a film adaptation of Artemis Fowl. Miramax Films was named as purchasing the film rights with Lawrence Guterman signed to direct and Jeff Stockwell to write. In 2003, Colfer stated that a screenplay had been finalized and that casting was due to start the same year but expressed skepticism over whether or not this would come to pass. The film remained in development and was assumed to be in development hell until 2011, when it was reported that Jim Sheridan was interested in directing the movie, with Saoirse Ronan attached as Holly Short. On December 20, 2017, it was announced that the film, now developed by Walt Disney Pictures and directed by Kenneth Branagh, had cast Lara McDonnell as Holly Short. Upon the film's release on June 12, 2020, the film was criticised for the removal of Short's character arcs from the book series in the film, and for the character being relegated from protagonist to supporting character. McDonnell's casting was additionally criticised as an example of whitewashing due to Short being physically described in the book series as having nut-brown skin of a coffee complexion.

See also

 Artemis Fowl II
 Whitewashing in film

References

Artemis Fowl characters
Female characters in literature
Fictional characters with heterochromia
Fictional elves
Fictional police officers
Fictional private investigators
Fictional bounty hunters
Literary characters introduced in 2001
Fictional police captains
Time travelers

fr:Personnages de Artemis Fowl#Holly Short